John Tomlin (1882 – 1941) was an Irish professional footballer who played as a defender for Sunderland.

References

1882 births
1941 deaths
People from County Kildare
Irish association footballers (before 1923)
Association football defenders
Seaham White Star F.C. players
Sunderland A.F.C. players
Middlesbrough F.C. players
Murton Red Star F.C. players
English Football League players